Saatse is a village in Setomaa Parish, Võru County in southeastern Estonia. It has a population of 89 (as of 2007).

Saatse and its neighbouring villages (Kundruse, Litvina, Pattina, Perdaku, Saabolda, Samarina, Sesniki and Ulitina) are notable as part of Estonia that although not an enclave, before 2008 wasn't reachable by road without passing through Russian territory for several hundred metres, through an area known as the Saatse Boot. In 2008 a new Matsuri–Sesniki road was opened, making it possible to reach the area without necessarily passing through the Saatse Boot. However, this is a 15–20 km detour if going from Värska.

Saatse was earlier known as Korki or Gorki. The present name Saatse has been derived from a Russian village name Zatšerenje that was later turned into Satseri and then Saatse. It an area inhabited by Seto people, Setos, who follow Orthodox traditions, and there is a Seto museum. The museum is a subsidiary of the Seto Talumuuseum (Seto Farm Museum) at Värska, was founded in 1974, and has 20,000 exhibits including collections of agricultural implements and machinery, fishing equipment, and pottery.

The oldest buildings in the village are the Holy Paraskeva Orthodox Church. The current stone building replaced a wooden structure from 1673 and was constructed in 1801. It had a  wooden belfry added in 1839, and was extended in length in 1884.

References

Villages in Võru County